Alexis Wright  (born 25 November 1950) is a Waanyi (Aboriginal Australian) writer best known for winning the Miles Franklin Award for her 2006 novel Carpentaria and the 2018 Stella Prize for her "collective memoir" of Leigh Bruce "Tracker" Tilmouth.

As of 2020, Wright has produced three novels, one biography, and several works of prose. Her work also appears in anthologies and journals.

Origin and activism
Alexis Wright is a land rights activist from the Waanyi nation in the highlands of the southern Gulf of Carpentaria. Wright's father, a white cattleman, died when she was five years old and she grew up in Cloncurry, Queensland, with her mother and grandmother.

When the Northern Territory Intervention proposed by the Howard Government in mid-2007 was introduced, Wright delivered a high-profile 10,000-word speech, sponsored by International PEN.

Literary career
Alexis Wright's first book, the novel Plains of Promise, published in 1997, was nominated for several literary awards and has been reprinted several times by University of Queensland Press.

Wright is also the author of non-fiction works: Take Power, on the history of the land rights movement, was published in 1998, and Grog War (Magabala Books) on the introduction of alcohol restrictions in Tennant Creek, published in 1997.

Her second novel, Carpentaria, took two years to conceive and more than six years to write. It was rejected by every major publisher in Australia before independent publisher Giramondo published it in 2006. Since then it has won the Miles Franklin Award in June 2007, the 2007 Fiction Book award in the Queensland Premier's Literary Awards, the 2007 ALS Gold Medal and the 2007 Vance Palmer Prize for Fiction.

In 2009, Wright wrote the words for Dirtsong, a musical theatre production created and performed by the Black Arm Band theatre company. The performance included both contemporary and traditional songs, and had its world premiere at the 2009 Melbourne International Arts Festival. The show was reprised for the 2014 Adelaide Festival, with performers including Trevor Jamieson, Archie Roach, Lou Bennett, Emma Donovan, Paul Dempsey, and many other singers and musicians. Some of the songs were sung in Aboriginal languages.

Wright was a 2012 attendee of the Byron Bay Writers Festival and Singapore Writers Festival.

Also in 2013, Wright's third novel, The Swan Book, was published. The book delves into the cultural and racial political challenges facing Australia's Indigenous peoples. It was shortlisted for the 2014 Victorian Premier's Literary Award for Indigenous Writing. 

In 2014 Wright was appointed an Honorary Fellow of the Australian Academy of the Humanities.

Wright's book, Tracker, her tribute to the central Australian economist Tracker Tilmouth, was published by Giramondo in 2017. A biographical work variously characterized as unconventional and complicated, Tracker won the 2018 Stella Prize. In the words of Ben Etherington: "It is a work, epic in scope and size, that will ensure that a legend of Central Australian politics is preserved in myth." She was awarded the 2018 Magarey Medal for Biography for Tracker. Tracker also won the 2018 University of Queensland Non-Fiction Book Award at the Queensland Literary Awards. and was shortlisted for the NSW Premier's Literary Awards, Douglas Stewart Prize for Non-Fiction 2019. Wright was on the program for four events at the 2017 Brisbane Writers Festival in Brisbane, Queensland, Australia.
 
In 2018, Wright conducted another storytelling collaboration, this time with the Gangalidda leader and activist Clarence Walden in Doomadgee, Northern Queensland. Her work with Walden led to two feature documentaries, Nothing but the Truth, a radio feature that broadcast on the Awaye! program on ABC Radio National in June 2019, and Straight from the Heart, a screen documentary that premiered at World Literature and the Global South in August 2019.

Academic career
Wright is a Distinguished Research Fellow at Western Sydney University.

Wright is currently a member of the Australian Research Council research project "Other Worlds: Forms of World Literature". Building on her success with Tracker, her theme for the project focuses on forms of Aboriginal oral storytelling.

In 2017, Wright was named the Boisbouvier Chair in Australian Literature at the University of Melbourne.

Bibliography 
Novels
 Plains of Promise (University of Queensland Press, 1997). Reprint 2000, 
 Carpentaria (Sydney: Giramondo, 2006)
 The Swan Book (Sydney: Giramondo, 2013)

Short stories
 Le pacte du serpent arc-en-ciel. [The Serpent’s Covenant] (Acte Sud, 2002). 

Non-fiction
 Grog War (Magabala, 1997). . Review
 Croire en l'incroyable. [Believing the Unbelievable] (Actes Sud, 2000). 
 Tracker (Sydney: Giramondo, 2017). 

Editor
 Take Power, Like This Old Man Here: An anthology of writings celebrating twenty years of land rights in Central Australia, 1977–1997 (IAD, 1998).

References

External links 
 "Breaking Taboos". Essay, Australian Humanities Review.
 Jane Perlez, "Aboriginal Lit", The New York Times, 18 November 2007. 
 Stephen Moss, "Dream warrior", The Guardian, 15 April 2008.
 "Alexis Wright wins Miles Franklin Award", The Age, 21 June 2007.
 "Other Worlds: Forms of World Literature"

1950 births
Australian women short story writers
Indigenous Australian writers
Miles Franklin Award winners
ALS Gold Medal winners
Living people
RMIT University alumni
Writers from Queensland
20th-century Australian novelists
21st-century Australian novelists
20th-century Australian women writers
21st-century Australian women writers
Australian women novelists
20th-century Australian short story writers
21st-century Australian short story writers
University of Melbourne women
Fellows of the Australian Academy of the Humanities
Australian science fiction writers